Acton Green is a village in the north east of the English county of Herefordshire (historically Worcestershire) between Bromyard and Great Malvern.

References

 

Villages in Herefordshire